Gene Kelly (1912–1996) was an American dancer, actor, singer, director, producer and choreographer whose work in motion pictures spans from 1942 to 1996. He is probably best known today for his performances in musicals, notably An American in Paris (1951) and Singin' in the Rain (1952).

Kelly made his Hollywood film debut in For Me and My Gal (1942), co-starring with Judy Garland. Afterward, he went on to work as an actor, dancer and subsequently, choreographer, in a series of musical films. In these films, his choreography included experiments with a combination of dance and animation (Anchors Aweigh and Invitation to the Dance) and dance scenes involving special effects (including the "Alter Ego" number from Cover Girl and the split-screen dance number from It's Always Fair Weather). In addition to his work as an actor and choreographer, Kelly directed or co-directed several films, some of which did not feature him in an acting role. Kelly appeared in several non-musical dramatic and comedy films as well.

Kelly received an Academy Award nomination for Best Actor for his performance in Anchors Aweigh (1945) and won an Honorary Academy Award for his work in An American in Paris (1951). He was voted the 15th most popular film actor on the American Film Institute’s millennium list, while Singin' in the Rain was voted the most popular movie musical of all time.
This filmography below contains a chronological listing of Gene Kelly's feature films. His musicals are indicated with a beamed eighth note symbol (♫).

Filmography 

 Choreography credits per Billman.

Footnotes

Bibliography

External links 
 
 

Male actor filmographies
American filmographies
Director filmographies